Elections to Coleraine Borough Council were held on 17 May 1989 on the same day as the other Northern Irish local government elections. The election used three district electoral areas to elect a total of 21 councillors.

Election results

Note: "Votes" are the first preference votes.

Districts summary

|- class="unsortable" align="centre"
!rowspan=2 align="left"|Ward
! % 
!Cllrs
! % 
!Cllrs
! %
!Cllrs
! %
!Cllrs
! % 
!Cllrs
!rowspan=2|TotalCllrs
|- class="unsortable" align="center"
!colspan=2 bgcolor="" | UUP
!colspan=2 bgcolor="" | DUP
!colspan=2 bgcolor="" | SDLP
!colspan=2 bgcolor="" | Alliance
!colspan=2 bgcolor="white"| Others
|-
|align="left"|Bann
|bgcolor="40BFF5"|59.2
|bgcolor="40BFF5"|4
|13.6
|1
|24.4
|2
|2.8
|0
|0.0
|0
|7
|-
|align="left"|Coleraine Town
|bgcolor="40BFF5"|41.3
|bgcolor="40BFF5"|3
|33.9
|2
|7.0
|0
|8.0
|1
|9.8
|1
|7
|-
|align="left"|The Skerries
|bgcolor="40BFF5"|43.4
|bgcolor="40BFF5"|3
|24.2
|2
|7.8
|0
|13.1
|1
|11.5
|1
|7
|-
|- class="unsortable" class="sortbottom" style="background:#C9C9C9"
|align="left"| Total
|48.5
|10
|23.4
|5
|13.5
|2
|7.9
|2
|6.7
|2
|21
|-
|}

District results

Bann

1985: 4 x UUP, 2 x SDLP, 1 x DUP
1989: 4 x UUP, 2 x SDLP, 1 x DUP
1985-1989 Change: No change

Coleraine Town

1985: 3 x DUP, 2 x UUP, 1 x Alliance, 1 x Independent
1989: 3 x UUP, 2 x DUP, 1 x Alliance, 1 x Independent
1985-1989 Change: UUP gain from DUP

The Skerries

1985: 4 x UUP, 2 x DUP, 1 x Alliance
1989: 3 x UUP, 2 x DUP, 1 x Alliance, 1 x Independent Unionist
1985-1989 Change: Independent Unionist leaves UUP

References

Coleraine Borough Council elections
Coleraine